Antarctic sea ice is the sea ice of the Southern Ocean. It extends from the far north in the winter and retreats to almost the coastline every summer, getting closer and closer to the coastline every year due to sea ice melting. Sea ice is frozen seawater that is usually less than a few meters thick. This is the opposite of ice shelves, which are formed by glaciers, they float in the sea, and are up to a kilometre thick. There are two subdivisions of sea ice: fast ice, which are attached to land; and ice floes, which are not.

Sea ice that comes from the Southern Ocean melts from the bottom instead of the surface like Arctic ice because it is covered in snow on top. As a result, melt ponds are rarely observed. On average, Antarctic sea ice is younger, thinner, warmer, saltier, and more mobile than Arctic sea ice. Sea ice is not studied very well in comparison to Arctic ice since it is less accessible.

Measurements of sea ice

Extent 
The Antarctic sea ice cover is highly seasonal, with very little ice in the austral summer, expanding to an area roughly equal to that of Antarctica in winter. It peaks (~18 × 10^6 km^2) during September, which marks the end of austral winter, and retreats to a minimum (~3 × 10^6 km^2) in February. Consequently, most Antarctic sea ice is first year ice, a few meters thick, but the exact thickness is not known. The area of 18 million km^2 of ice is 18 trillion square meters, so for each meter of thickness, given that the density of ice is about 0.88 teratonnes/million km^3, the mass of the top meter of Antarctic sea ice is roughly 16 teratonnes (trillion metric tons) in late winter. Record low summer sea ice was measured in February 2022 at 741,000 square miles (1.9 million square kilometers) by the National Snow and Ice Data Center.

Since the ocean off the Antarctic coast usually is much warmer than the air above it, the extent of the sea ice is largely controlled by the winds and currents that push it northwards. If it is pushed quickly, the ice can travel much further north before it melts. Most ice is formed along the coast, as the northward-moving ice leaves areas of open water (coastal latent-heat polynyas ), which rapidly freeze.

Thickness 

Because Antarctic ice is mainly first-year ice, which is not as thick as multiyear ice, it is generally less than a few meters thick. Snowfall and flooding of the ice can thicken it substantially, and the layer structure of Antarctic ice is often quite complex.

Recent trends and climate change

Recent changes in wind patterns, which are connected to regional changes in the number of extratropical cyclones and anticyclones, around Antarctica have advected the sea ice farther north in some areas and not as far north in others. The net change is a slight increase in the area of sea ice in the Antarctic seas (unlike the Arctic Ocean, which is showing a much stronger decrease in the area of sea ice). Increased sea ice extent does not indicate that the Southern Ocean is cooling, since the Southern Ocean is warming.

The IPCC AR5 report concluded that "it is very likely" that annual mean Antarctic sea ice extent increased 1.2 to 1.8% per decade, which is 0.13 to 0.20 million km2 per decade, during the period 1979 to 2012. IPCC AR5 also concluded that the lack of data precludes determining the trend in total volume or mass of the sea ice. The increase in sea ice area probably has a number of causes. These are tied to changes in the southern hemispheric westerly winds, which are a combination of natural variability and forced change from greenhouse gases and the ozone hole. The winds drive sea ice drift, and modelling research suggests that the observed sea ice expansion was driven by changes in the sea ice drift velocity.
Another possible driver is ice-shelves melting, which increases freshwater input to the ocean; this increases the weakly stratified ocean surface layer and so reduces the ability of warm subsurface water to reach the surface. A 2015 study found this effect in climate models run to simulate future climate change, resulting in an increase of sea ice in the winter months.

Atmospheric and oceanic drivers likely have contributed to the formation of regionally varying trends in Antarctic sea-ice extent. For example, temperatures in the atmosphere and Southern Ocean have increased during the period 1979–2004. However, sea ice grows faster than it melts, because of a weakly stratified ocean. Thus, this oceanic mechanism is, among others, contributing to an increase in the net ice production, potentially resulting in more sea ice. 
Although thickness observations are limited, modelling suggests that observed ice-drift toward the coastal regions makes an additional contribution for dynamical sea-ice thickening during autumn and winter.

Observed autumn and spring trends in the number of extratropical cyclones, anticyclones and blocks, which have a strong thermodynamic control through temperature advection, and a strong dynamic control through ice-drift, on sea-ice extent during the same and also during following seasons are almost everywhere around Antarctica in agreement with the observed, regionally varying, trends in sea-ice extent. Consequently, the near-surface winds steered around weather systems are thought to explain large parts of the inhomogeneous Antarctica sea-ice trends.

After gradual increases in sea ice as referenced above, southern hemisphere spring (i.e. September, October and November) 2016 saw a rapid decline in Antarctic sea ice. 

The IPCC AR6 report confirms the observed increasing trend in the mean Antarctic sea ice area over the period from 1979 to 2014 but assesses that there was a decline after 2014, with the least extent reached in 2017, and a following growth. The report then concludes that there is “high confidence” that there is no significant trend in the satellite observed Antarctic sea ice area from 1979 to 2020 in both winter and summer.

In early January 2023, the National Snow and Ice Data Center reported that Antarctic sea ice extent stood at the lowest in the 45-year satellite record—more than 500,000 square kilometers (193,000 square miles) below the previous record (2018), with four of the five lowest years for the last half of December having occurred since 2016.

Implications

Monitoring changes in sea ice is important as this impacts the psychrophiles that live here.

Changes in Antarctic sea ice are also important because of implications for atmospheric and oceanic circulation. When sea ice forms, it rejects salt (ocean water is saline but sea ice is largely fresh) so dense salty water is formed which sinks and plays a key role in formation of Antarctic Bottom Water.

Effects on Navigation

The force of moving ice is considerable; it can crush ships that are caught in the ice pack, and severely limits the areas where ships can reach the land, even in summer. Icebreakers, iceports and ice piers are used to land supplies.

See also
Arctic sea ice decline
Antarctic ice sheet

References

External links
 NSIDC | Why is there so much Antarctic sea ice?

Forms of water
Hydrology
Sea ice
Sea ice
Oceans surrounding Antarctica
Articles containing video clips
Climate change and the environment